Ghost Stories is an American horror anthology television series that ran from 1997 to 1998 on The Family Channel.

The show was narrated by Rip Torn and originally two episodes were presented back to back in an hour-long segment. However, towards the end of the series, it was broken down into 30 minute episodes with just one story, most featuring a style similar to episodes of The Twilight Zone in which there would be a twist at the end.

There have been five DVD releases. Also, Ghost Stories was shown in the United Kingdom on ITV and, more recently, the TV channel Zone Horror.

Episodes

Each episode begins with an introduction segment narrated by Rip Torn (viewable in QuickTime or in Windows Media):

Come with me to a place of wondrous contradictions. A place that is silent and unstirring yet restless and alive. A place of untold peace and boundless dread. Come with me into the very cradle of darkness, where those who dwell, dwell alone.

Once complete, it goes directly into the episode where Rip Torn introduces the episode. During the episode's conclusion, Rip Torn comments on what was seen (usually in some form of a moral).

Home releases

Volume sets

Complete set
On September 30, 2008, the complete series was released in a 6-disc set, including the 4 never-before-seen episodes. The set comes in a new digipack with the same 5 volumes and a 6th disc including the 4 never-before released episodes. It was released on region 1 with no other bonus features.

This set includes the episodes shown below and does not have any special features or commentary.

Disc 1
 Cold In The Grave
 Landscape Of Lost Dreams
 Personal Demons
 You'll Wake The Dead
 Mirror, Mirror
 You'll Always Be Mine
 Back Ward
 Beware The Muse

Disc 2
 The Stainless Blade
 Wake In Fear
 Last Flight Out
 Resting Place
 Step-Sister
 All Night Diner
 Beat The Reaper 
 Green-Eyed Monster

Disc 3
 Blood Money
 Cold Dark Space
 Sara's Friends
 I Heard You Call My Name
 Conscience
 Bless Me Father
 Fatal Distraction
 Sleep No More

Disc 4
Cloistered
The House That Spilled Tears
Blazes
The New Nanny
Underground
Point Hope
The Scream House
State Of Grace

Disc 5
 Heartsick
 From The Ashes
 Winner Take All
 Inheritance
 Denial
 Erased
 Parting Shot
 Consumers

Disc 6
 It's Only A Movie
 At Death's Door
 Going Down
 Cabin Fever

Technical data
 Region: Region 1
 Aspect Ratio: 1.33:1
 Rating: PG-13
 Run Time: 910 minutes
 UPC: 096009576899

See also
 List of Ghost Stories episodes
 List of ghost films

Similar shows
 Perversions of Science
 Tales from the Crypt
 Tales from the Darkside
 The Twilight Zone

References

External links
 
 Ghost Stories at the production company New Dominion Pictures
 Information Page on TVShowsOnDVD.com
 Listing at UK TV channel Zone Horror
 Product Page at Echo Bridge Entertainment (formerly Platinum Disc Corporation)
 Ghost Stories set on Amazon.com

1990s American anthology television series
1990s American horror television series
1997 American television series debuts
1998 American television series endings
Television series about ghosts
The Family Channel (American TV network, founded 1990) original programming
Television series by New Dominion Pictures